The Carless Husband is a comedy play by the English writer Colley Cibber. It premiered at the Theatre Royal, Drury Lane on 7 December 1704. The original cast featured Cibber as Lord Foppington, George Powell as Lord Morelove, Robert Wilks as Sir Charles Easy, Anne Oldfield as  Lady Betty Modish, Frances Maria Knight as Lady Easy, Henrietta Moore as Lady Graveairs and Jane Lucas as Mrs Edging.

References

Bibliography
 Van Lennep, W. The London Stage, 1660-1800: Volume Two, 1700-1729. Southern Illinois University Press, 1960.

1704 plays
West End plays
Plays by Colley Cibber
Restoration comedy